State Route 221 (SR 221) is a  route that serves as a western bypass of Camden in Wilcox County.

Route description
The southern terminus of SR 221 is located at its intersection with SR 41 to the southwest of Camden. From this point, the route travels in a northward direction on a two-lane undivided road, passing through a mix of farms and woods. The road passes to the east of Camden Municipal Airport before coming to an intersection with SR 10. Following this, SR 221 continues north through wooded areas with some homes. The route runs through a mix of farmland and woodland before coming to its northern terminus at SR 28 northwest of Camden at Canton Bend.

Major intersections

References

221
Transportation in Wilcox County, Alabama